Canadian Film Makers is a Canadian short film television series which aired on CBC Television in 1967.

Premise
Lloyd Robertson hosted this series of Canadian short films. Producers ranged from the National Film Board of Canada to independent filmmakers.

Scheduling
This half-hour series was broadcast Wednesdays at 10:30 p.m. (Eastern) from 19 April to 14 June 1967.

Episodes

Episodes included the following films:

 Free Fall (Arthur Lipsett)
 Op Hop (Pierre Hébert)
 People Might Laugh at Us (Jacques Godbout)
 Rouli Roulant (Claude Jutra)
 Sebring (Claude Fournier)
 2½ (Tom Daly)
 Zero to Max (Ron Wisman)

References

External links
 

CBC Television original programming
1967 Canadian television series debuts
1967 Canadian television series endings